Joe Gatto (born 1976) is an American comedian.

Joe Gatto may also refer to:
 Joe Gatto (artist) (1893–1965), American artist
 Joe Gatto (baseball) (born 1995), American professional baseball pitcher